Aquae Calidae, Latin for "hot waters", may refer to:

Aquae Calidae, ancient name of Caldas de Reis, Spain
Aquae Calidae, ancient name of Çiftehan, Turkey
Aquae Calidae, ancient name of Vichy, France
Aquae Calidae, Algeria
Aquae Calidae, Bulgaria
Aquae Calidae Neapolitanorum, Italy
Aquae Sulis, called "Aquae Calidae" in Ptolemy's Geographia